Kapitäne bleiben an Bord is an East German film. It was released in 1959.

Cast

External links
 
 Kapitäne bleiben an Bord at filmportal.de

1959 films
East German films
1950s German-language films
Films about fishing
Films set in the Atlantic Ocean
1950s German films